State Route 168 (SR 168) is a state highway that runs west–east through portions of Berrien, Lanier, and Clinch counties in the south-central part of the U.S. state of Georgia.

Route description
The route begins at an intersection with US 129/SR 11/SR 76/SR 125 in Nashville. It heads southeast to an intersection with SR 64/SR 135 north of Lakeland, where SR 64 begins a concurrency to the east. Farther to the east, SR 64 leaves the concurrency to the northeast. Northwest of its eastern terminus is an intersection with US 221/SR 31. The highway continues to the southeast until it meets its eastern terminus, an intersection with SR 37 west of Homerville.

Major intersections

See also

References

External links

 
 Georgia Roads (Routes 161 - 180)

168
Transportation in Berrien County, Georgia
Transportation in Lanier County, Georgia
Transportation in Clinch County, Georgia